Sharnee Fenwick is a country singer from Newcastle, New South Wales. Her song "How 'Bout Never" reached the Top 20 on the Australian Country Music Charts. She won a Deadly in 2006 for best new talent and was nominated in 2007 for single release of the year. She was featured in an episode of SBS's TV series Living Black.

Discography
Sharnee Fenwick ep (2006)
"Kiss That Boy" (2007)

References

External links
Sharnee Fenwick Myspace page

Living people
Australian women singers
Indigenous Australian musicians
Year of birth missing (living people)